Riverton is a station on the River Line light rail system, located along South Broad Street between Thomas Avenue and Main Street in Riverton, New Jersey, though it is officially addressed as being on Main Street.

The station opened on March 15, 2004. Southbound service from the station is available to Camden, New Jersey. Northbound service is available to the Trenton Rail Station with connections to New Jersey Transit trains to New York City, SEPTA trains to Philadelphia, Pennsylvania, and Amtrak trains. Transfer to the PATCO Speedline is available at the Walter Rand Transportation Center.

The station contains a traffic circle at South Broad Street and Lippincott Avenue, with non-functioning railroad signals and a sign on the evolution of grade crossing signs in front of a bicycle rack. A similar display can be found at Burlington South further to the northeast.

Transfers 
New Jersey Transit buses: 419

References

External links

 Station from Google Maps Street View

River Line stations
Railway stations in the United States opened in 2004
2004 establishments in New Jersey
Railway stations in Burlington County, New Jersey
Riverton, New Jersey